Qarabaldır or Karabaldyr may refer to:
Qarabaldır, Oghuz, Azerbaijan
Qarabaldır, Qakh, Azerbaijan